High Score or  Hi Score may refer to:

 High score, the highest logged point value in a game
 High score Scrabble, a variant of the board game Scrabble
 A satirical term for a high kill count, usually used in the context of mass shootings

Media
 Hi Score Girl, a Japanese manga series written and illustrated by Rensuke Oshikiri
 Hi Scores, an EP by Scottish electronic music duo Boards of Canada
 Hi-Score – The Best of Che Fu, the first hits collection released by New Zealand hip-hop/R&B male vocalist Che Fu
 High Score (TV series), a Netflix docuseries created by France Costrel

See also